Francis Libermann Catholic High School (alternatively known as Francis Libermann CHS, Libermann High, FLCHS, FL, Francis Libermann, or Libermann) is a Catholic secondary school (as of 2003, an elementary school as well) in Toronto, Ontario, Canada. It is located in the Agincourt neighbourhood of Scarborough, and part of the Toronto Catholic District School Board, formerly the Metropolitan Separate School Board. 

The school is named after the priest Francis Libermann, a French Jewish convert to Roman Catholicism in the 19th century and the "Second Founder" of the Congregation of the Holy Spirit. It was initially founded in 1977 as a semi-private school. It became a public separate school in 1986. Libermann is enrolled with 927 students as of 2018-19 and ranked 148 of 738 schools in Fraser Institute Report Card. The motto is "Inter Mutanda Constantia" ("Steadfast in the midst of Change")

History 

Since the openings of Neil McNeil High School (founded by the Spiritan Fathers) in 1958, John J. Lynch High School in 1963 and Cardinal Newman High School in 1973, most of northern Scarborough is underdeveloped before the 1970s. However, the area is served by several existing high schools: Agincourt Collegiate Institute, Sir John A. Macdonald Collegiate Institute, Stephen Leacock Collegiate Institute, and nearby Albert Campbell Collegiate Institute with the latter opened the year prior.

Francis Libermann Catholic High School was founded in 1977 under the direction of the Spiritan order and the Metropolitan Separate School Board, with Father John Geary CSSp as principal. Originally, Libermann was intended to be a middle school in the city of Toronto. The idea for the school usage was changed after the school was built and instead to be used by students of grades 9 to OAC. 

The building was constructed in 1981. Because this design accommodated a more petite student body, the school had to deal with perpetual overcrowding, requiring the construction of additions and alterations. Portables were built for the surplus of students. Over many years, the school underwent additional construction projects such as expanding the gymnasium, adding an annex, and adding an entirely new section containing an office, atrium and cafeteria,m most notably in 2006. 

From the beginning, Libermann was mainly a private school,l with the MSSB assuming the responsibility for educating grade 9 and 10 students. From 1985 onward,s in the aftermath of the government announcement of the total funding of Roman Catholic high schools, Libermann ceased as a private school. The MSSB now has complete control of the school, with the Spiritans withdrawing day-to-day operations.

In 1986, the school had 1,100 students and 63 full-time staff members. During that year the school was overcrowded with students as it served an area of Scarborough with many new students. To resolve these issues, staff members devised a schedule involving required study halls for students with spare periods and separated up and down staircases. Only 100 or so students could be seated at the cafeteria during lunch hours, and the remainder had to eat lunches at their desks. The overcrowding resulted in the MSSB establishing two new schools in the northern Scarborough area in 1985: Mary Ward in Steeles/Willowdale using two campuses and Mother Teresa in Malvern.

In the summer of 2018, 3 additional portables were built due to increased enrollment.

Overview

Surroundings 

The school is surrounded by the Brimley Woods forest to the north, Royal Crown Academic School (Formerly Charles O' Bick Police Academy), a fire hall to the west, a ravine to the east, and an arterial road, Finch Avenue East to the south.

Transportation 

The nearest bus stop, located outside of the school, is 39 Finch East to Finch Station. The closest intersection is Finch and Brimley Avenue, where there are stops for the 21 Brimley, 39 Finch West/East and 939 Finch Rocket bus routes.

Programs 
Libermann High offers the required courses to obtain the diploma, as well as other elective courses. A STEM program is also within Libermann. Apart from having many different courses, the majority have various teaching and grade levels – some are prerequisites to others.

Uniforms
During normal classes, students are expected to wear the school uniform – a combination of grey dress pants, a white dress shirt, a golf shirt, a polo sweater, a knit sweater, a knit sweater-vest, a kilt with school colours, and black shoes.

Campus 
Libermann High accommodates a library and computer labs; some computers were donated through a Bill Gates program.

Student body 
The FL Catholic Elementary School program began in 2003 and ended in the 2018-2019 school year. The number of students varies year to year from 750–1000, currently home to grades 9 to 12. Graduates may stay for a fifth year even after the termination of OAC.

Notable alumni
Serouj Kradjian - multiple Juno-winning and Grammy-nominated pianist, composer & arranger
Teresa Pavlinek - actress and writer
Dan-e-o - hip-hop artist and actor

References

External links

Educational institutions established in 1977
High schools in Toronto
Catholic secondary schools in Ontario
Toronto Catholic District School Board
1977 establishments in Ontario
Education in Scarborough, Toronto
Spiritan schools